Guinea Creole can refer to:

Upper Guinea Creoles (disambiguation) — Group of Creoles that include Guinea-Bissau Creole and Cape Verdean Creole 
Guinea-Bissau Creole — Creole spoken in Guinea-Bissau